The comet darner (Anax longipes) is a common species of dragonfly of the family Aeshnidae.

Description
The comet darner is a large dragonfly and has a green thorax and bright red abdomen. Females have a brownish abdomen patterned with blue spots.

Distribution and habitat
Comet darners are found in shallow lakes and ponds which tend to have extensive beds and grasses and lack fish. They are found along the eastern United States from Missouri, Michigan, New England and some even further north.

Endangered status
Its endangered status is of least concern.

References

Aeshnidae
Insects described in 1861